José Manuel García Naranjo (born 28 July 1994) is a Spanish professional footballer who plays as a forward for SD Ponferradina.

Football career
Born in Rociana del Condado, Huelva, Andalusia, Naranjo graduated from local Recreativo de Huelva, and spent his first year as a senior with the B-team in Tercera División. On 2 June 2013 he first appeared for the main squad, starting in a 0–0 away draw against Sporting de Gijón in the Segunda División.

In July 2014, Naranjo was loaned to Segunda División B's Villarreal CF B, in a season-long deal. He appeared in his first game with the first team on 4 December, starting in a 2–1 away win against Cádiz CF, for the campaign's Copa del Rey.

In 2015 Naranjo signed a three-year deal with Gimnàstic de Tarragona, newly promoted to the second level. He scored his first professional goal on 29 November, netting the game's only in an away success against CD Mirandés.

Naranjo also scored seven goals in a period of three months (between January and March 2016), including match-winners against CD Tenerife and Elche CF. On 1 May, he scored a brace in a 3–2 home win against Mirandés.

In June 2016, Naranjo signed a five-year deal with La Liga club Celta de Vigo, for a rumoured fee of €1 million. He only appeared in three matches for the club, two in the UEFA Europa League, before departing.

In January 2017, Naranjo moved abroad for the first time in his career after agreeing to a contract with Belgian Pro League side K.R.C. Genk. On 1 September, he returned to Spain and its first division after agreeing to a one-year loan deal with CD Leganés.

On 27 July 2018, Naranjo signed a four-year deal with Tenerife in the second division. On 30 January 2020, he was loaned to Cypriot First Division side AEK Larnaca FC until the end of the season, with the deal being extended for a further year on 25 August.

Naranjo cut ties with Tenerife on 24 June 2021, and moved to fellow second division side SD Ponferradina on 12 July.

References

External links

1994 births
Living people
Sportspeople from the Province of Huelva
Spanish footballers
Footballers from Andalusia
Association football forwards
Segunda División players
Segunda División B players
Tercera División players
Belgian Pro League players
Atlético Onubense players
Recreativo de Huelva players
Villarreal CF B players
Villarreal CF players
Gimnàstic de Tarragona footballers
RC Celta de Vigo players
CD Leganés players
CD Tenerife players
SD Ponferradina players
K.R.C. Genk players
Cypriot First Division players
AEK Larnaca FC players
Spanish expatriate footballers
Spanish expatriate sportspeople in Belgium
Spanish expatriate sportspeople in Cyprus
Expatriate footballers in Belgium
Expatriate footballers in Cyprus